Myroe is a large farming hamlet on the outskirts of Limavady, County Londonderry, Northern Ireland. It was built in the late 18th century CE on reclaimed land in the Roe Valley close to Lough Foyle.

The village was the venue for the 1991 World Ploughing Contest.

Its inhabitants are known as duck men owing to the number of individuals with webbed toes, thought to have evolved due to the marshy landscape.

Local tradition holds that Jane Ross first wrote down the tune The Londonderry Air after hearing it played by a blind fiddler from Myroe named Jimmy McCurry.

References

Villages in County Londonderry